The Church of San Salvador (Spanish: Iglesia de San Salvador) is a church located in Cifuentes, Spain. It was declared Bien de Interés Cultural in 1991.

Between 1261 and 1268, the church was erected in a late-Romanesque, early-Gothic style.

References 

Bien de Interés Cultural landmarks in the Province of Guadalajara
Churches in the Province of Guadalajara
13th-century Roman Catholic church buildings in Spain
Churches completed in 1268